In mathematics and computer science, polynomial evaluation refers to computation of the value of a polynomial when its indeterminates are substituted for some values. In other words, evaluating the polynomial  at  consists of computing  See also 

For evaluating the univariate polynomial  the most naive method would use  multiplications to compute , use  multiplications to compute  and so on for a total of  multiplications and  additions.
Using better methods, such as Horner's rule, this can be reduced to  multiplications and  additions. If some preprocessing is allowed, even more savings are possible.

Background
This problem arises frequently in practice. In computational geometry, polynomials are used to compute function approximations using Taylor polynomials. In cryptography and hash tables, polynomials are used to compute k-independent hashing.

In the former case, polynomials are evaluated using floating-point arithmetic, which is not exact. Thus different schemes for the evaluation will, in general, give slightly different answers. In the latter case, the polynomials are usually evaluated in a finite field, in which case the answers are always exact.

General methods

Horner's rule

Horner's method evaluates a polynomial using repeated bracketing:

This method reduces the number of multiplications and additions to just 

Horner's method is so common that a computer instruction "multiply–accumulate operation" has been added to many computer processors, which allow doing the addition and multiplication operations in one combined step.

Multivariate

If the polynomial is multivariate, Horner's rule can be applied recursively over some ordering of the variables.
E.g.

can be written as 

An efficient version of this approach was described by Carnicer and Gasca.

Estrin's scheme

While it's not possible to do less computation than Horner's rule (without preprocessing), on modern computers the order of evaluation can matter a lot for the computational efficiency.
A method known as Estrin's scheme computes a (single variate) polynomial in a tree like pattern:

Combined by Exponentiation by squaring, this allows parallelizing the computation.

Evaluation with preprocessing

Arbitrary polynomials can be evaluated with fewer
operations than Horner's rule requires if we first "preprocess"
the coefficients .

An example was first given by Motzkin who noted that

can be written as

Motzkin's method uses just 3 multiplications compared to Horner's 4.

The values for each  can be easily computed by expanding  and equating the coefficients:

Example 
To compute the Taylor expansion ,
we can upscale by a factor 24, apply the above steps, and scale back down.
That gives us the three multiplication computation

Improving over the equivalent Horner form (that is ) by 1 multiplication.

Some general methods include the Knuth-Eve algorithm and the Rabin-Winograd algorithm.

Multipoint evaluation

Evaluate of a -degree polynomial  in multiple points  can be done with  multiplications by using Horner's method  times. Using above preprocessing approach, this can be reduced that by a factor of two, that is, to  multiplications. However, it is possible to do better.

It is possible to reduce the time requirement to just .
We then compute  and  using the Polynomial remainder theorem, which can be done in  time using a fast Fourier transform.

In the case where the points in which we wish to evaluate the polynomials have some structure, simpler methods exist.
For example, Knuth section 4.6.4
gives a method for tabulating polynomial values of the type

Dynamic evaluation 

In the case where  are not known in advance,
This was shown by Larsen to be essentially optimal.

Using the Chinese remainder theorem, it suffices to evaluate  modulo different primes  with a product at least .
That means we can compute and store  on all the possible values in  time and space.
If we take , we get , so the time/space requirement is just 

Kedlaya and Umans further show how to combine this preprocessing with fast (FFT) multipoint evaluation.
This allows optimal algorithms for many important algebraic problems, such as polynomial modular composition.

Specific polynomials

While general polynomials require  operations to evaluate, some polynomials can be computed much faster.
For example, the polynomial  can be computed using just one multiplication and one addition since

Evaluation of powers

A particularly interesting type of polynomial is powers like .
Such polynomials can always be computed in  operations.

The most efficient way to compute a given power  is provided by addition-chain exponentiation. However, this requires designing a specific algorithm for each exponent, and the computation needed for designing these algorithms are difficult (NP-complete), so exponentiation by squaring is generally preferred for effective computations.

Polynomial families

Often polynomials show up in a different form than the well known .
For polynomials in Chebyshev form we can use Clenshaw algorithm.
For polynomials in Bézier form we can use De Casteljau's algorithm,
and for B-splines there is De Boor's algorithm.

Hard polynomials

The fact that some polynomials can be computed significantly faster than "general polynomials" suggests the question: Can we give an example of a simple polynomial that cannot be computed in time much smaller than its degree?
Volker Strassen has shown that the polynomial

cannot be evaluated by with less than  multiplications and  additions.
At least this bound holds if only operations of those types are allowed, giving rise to a so-called "polynomial chain of length ".

The polynomial given by Strassen has very large coefficients, but by probabilistic methods, one can show there must exist even polynomials with coefficients just 0's and 1's such that the evaluation requires at least  multiplications.

For other simple polynomials, the complexity is unknown.
The polynomial  is conjectured to not be computable in time  for any .
This is supported by the fact, that if it can be computed fast then Integer factorization can be computed in polynomial time, breaking the RSA cryptosystem.

Matrix polynomials

Sometimes the computational cost of scalar multiplications (like ) is less than the computational cost of "non scalar" multiplications (like ).
The typical example of this is matrices.

Matrix polynomials are important for example for computing the Matrix Exponential.

Paterson and Stockmeyer 
showed how to compute a degree  polynomial using only  non scalar multiplications and  scalar multiplications.
Thus a matrix polynomial of degree  can be evaluated in  time. If  this is less than  that is, faster than a single matrix multiplication with the standard algorithm.

This method works as follows: For a polynomial 

let  be the least integer not smaller than 
Now,
,
This requires just  more non-scalar multiplications.

We can write this succinctly using the Kronecker product:
.

See also 
Estrin's scheme to facilitate parallelization on modern computer architectures
Arithmetic circuit complexity theory studies the computational complexity of evaluating different polynomials.

References

Polynomials